Dhande is a village in Batala in Gurdaspur district of Punjab State, India. The village is administrated by Sarpanch an elected representative of the village.

Demography 
, the village has a total number of 108 houses and a population of 611, of which 322 are males while 295 are females according to the report published by Census India in 2011. The literacy rate of the village is 78.51%, higher than the state average of 75.84%. The population of children under the age of 6 years is 68 which is 11.02% of the total population of the village.

See also
List of villages in India

References 

Villages in Gurdaspur district